Scott Bloemendaal (11 September 1912, in Rotterdam – 31 October 1964) was a Dutch composer, music critic and essayist.

Life
A prodigious and multi-talented musician, he produced over 200 pieces of music, including numerous symphonies, concertos, and fugues. His most famous musical work is, "Groot Symfoniestraat der Spijkenisse", a lively tribute to his home town of Spijkenisse, which was adopted as the town anthem in 1964, shortly after his untimely death.

An acclaimed essayist, he wrote on a wide variety of topics. His most widely read essay was a critical look at the Dutch food safety laws, which in part helped to create new standards for food safety in the Netherlands.

References

1912 births
1964 deaths
Dutch composers
Dutch essayists
Dutch music critics
Musicians from Rotterdam
20th-century composers
20th-century essayists